Verbivka is a village in Izium Raion (district) in Kharkiv Oblast of eastern Ukraine, at about  southeast by south (SEbS) from the centre of Kharkiv city. It belongs to Balakliia urban hromada, one of the hromadas of Ukraine.

Until 18 July 2020, Verbivka belonged to Balakliia Raion. The raion was abolished in July 2020 as part of the administrative reform of Ukraine, which reduced the number of raions of Kharkiv Oblast to seven. The area of Balakliia Raion was merged into Izium Raion.

The settlement came under attack by Russian forces during the Russian invasion of Ukraine in 2022 and was regained by Ukrainian forces in the beginning of September the same year.

References

Villages in Izium Raion
Izyumsky Uyezd